Ashotsk is a village in the Ashotsk Municipality of the Shirak Province of Armenia. The Statistical Committee of Armenia reported its population was 2,482 in 2010, up from 2,378 at the 2001 census.

Demographics

References 

Communities in Shirak Province
Populated places in Shirak Province